Agony in the Garden is a small 1524 oil on panel painting of the Agony in the Garden by Correggio, now at Apsley House in London.

History
Now in a poor state, the painting was admired by Vasari in Reggio Emilia - he described it as:

This is supported by a contemporary print of the work by Bernardino Curti and a 17th-18th century copy now in the National Gallery.

It was still in Reggio Emilia in the 1580s, in the collection of Rodolfo Signoretti, where it was studied by Lelio Orsi (who copied from it in Christ among the crosses), Titian, Lomazzo, El Greco and Annibale Carracci. A 1582 source reported that "news [of the work had circulated] in Spain and in Rome" and that Philip II of Spain and Alfonso II d'Este had both tried in vain to buy it. The Milanese nobleman Pirro Visconti succeeded in buying it around 1587 and brought it to his villa at Lainate in Milan, where it found favour as part of the deeply religious era of St Charles Borromeo, who kept a copy of it in the room where he died. It was also copied by Giulio Campi in a painting now in the Pinacoteca Ambrosiana. From the house of Visconti it passed to the Marquis of Caracena before being taken to Spain by the end of the 17th century - there it was admired by Anton Raphael Mengs before being acquired by the Duke of Wellington during the Peninsular War.

References

Correggio
1524 paintings
Paintings in the Wellington Collection
Angels in art